Motatán is one of the 20 municipalities of the state of Trujillo, Venezuela. The municipality occupies an area of 115 km2 with a population of 20,162 inhabitants according to the 2011 census.

Parishes
The municipality consists of the following three parishes:

 Motatán
 El Baño
 Jalisco

References

Municipalities of Trujillo (state)